16 Arietis (abbreviated 16 Ari) is a star in the northern constellation of Aries. 16 Arietis is the Flamsteed designation. Its apparent magnitude is 6.01. The brightness of this star is diminished by 0.40 in magnitude from extinction caused by interstellar gas and dust. This is an evolved giant star with a stellar classification of K3 III.

References

External links
 HR 633
 Image 16 Arietis

013363
Arietis, 16
010203
Aries (constellation)
K-type giants
0633
Durchmusterung objects